The 2018–19 Nashville Predators season was the 21st season for the National Hockey League franchise that was established on June 25, 1997. They entered the season as the defending Presidents' Trophy winners, which was won by the Tampa Bay Lightning on March 18, 2019. The Predators clinched a playoff spot on March 25, after a 1–0 win over the Minnesota Wild. They were upset in the first round by the Dallas Stars, losing in six games.

Standings

Schedule and results

Preseason
The preseason schedule was published on June 12, 2018.

Regular season
The regular season schedule was released on June 21, 2018.

Playoffs

The Predators faced the Dallas Stars in the First Round of the playoffs, and were defeated in six games.

Player statistics
As of April 22, 2019

Skaters

Goaltenders

†Denotes player spent time with another team before joining the Predators. Stats reflect time with the Predators only.
‡Denotes player was traded mid-season. Stats reflect time with the Predators only.
Bold/italics denotes franchise record.

Transactions
The Predators have been involved in the following transactions during the 2018–19 season.

Trades

Free agents

Waivers

Contract terminations

Retirement

Signings

Draft picks

Below are the Nashville Predators' selections at the 2018 NHL Entry Draft, which was held on June 22 and 23, 2018, at the American Airlines Center in Dallas, Texas.

Notes:
 The Columbus Blue Jackets' fourth-round pick went to the Nashville Predators as the result of a trade on February 25, 2018, that sent Mark Letestu to Columbus in exchange for this pick.
 The Chicago Blackhawks' fifth-round pick went to the Nashville Predators as the result of a trade on February 26, 2018, that sent Victor Ejdsell and a first and fourth-round pick both in 2018 to Chicago in exchange for Ryan Hartman and this pick.

References

Nashville Predators seasons
Nashville Predators
Nashville Predators
Nashville Predators